Neocerapachys is a genus of ants in the subfamily Dorylinae containing 2 described species. The genus is distributed across the Neotropical bioregion in central and South America. Neocerapachys was described by Borowiec (2016) during redescription of the doryline genera.

Species
Species:
Neocerapachys neotropicus 
Neocerapachys splendens

References

Ant genera
Ants
Dorylinae